The 2022 Arizona Bowl was a college football bowl game played on December 30, 2022, at Arizona Stadium in Tucson, Arizona. The seventh annual Arizona Bowl, the game featured Ohio from the Mid-American Conference (MAC) and Wyoming from the Mountain West Conference. The game began at 2:40 p.m. MST and was aired on Barstool Sports's website and social media. Ohio defeated Wyoming in overtime 30–27.  Ohio's quarterback CJ Harris was named the most-valuable player.  It was one of the 2022–23 bowl games concluding the 2022 FBS football season. Barstool Sports was also the game's title sponsor.

Teams
Consistent with conference tie-ins, the game featured teams from the Mid-American Conference (MAC) and the Mountain West Conference. This was the third meeting between Ohio and Wyoming; the Cowboys had won both previous meetings.

Ohio

Ohio played to a 9–3 regular season record (7–1 in conference). After losing three of their first five games, they won seven games in a row. The Bobcats qualified for the MAC Championship Game, which they lost to Toledo, and entered the Arizona Bowl with an overall record of 9-4.

Wyoming

Wyoming played to a 7–5 regular-season record, 5–3 in conference play. Their season included three-game and four-game winning streaks, but they closed with back-to-back losses. The Cowboys faced, and lost to, one ranked opponent, BYU.

Game summary

Statistics

References

Arizona Bowl
Arizona Bowl
Arizona Bowl
Arizona Bowl
Ohio Bobcats football bowl games
Wyoming Cowboys football bowl games